Carl Johan Arvid Bergman (born 10 October 1987) is a retired Swedish tennis player.

Career
Bergman made his ATP main draw debut at the 2008 Swedish Open in the doubles draw partnering Henrik Norfeldt. The pair lost in the second round to David Ferrer and Marc Lopez.  Bergman also participated in the doubles at the 2010 Swedish Open, partnering Filip Prpic and the 2011 Swedish Open, partnering Patrik Rosenholm. On each of those occasions he and his partner lost in the first round. As per ATP Tour and ITF World Tennis Tour main draw, Bergman won 104 singles matches and lost 85 and in career doubles, he won 94 and lost 66.

Bergman has a career high ATP singles ranking of 500 achieved on 30 January 2012. He also has a career-high ATP doubles ranking of 475 achieved on 15 September 2008.

ITF Futures titles

Singles: (2)

Doubles: (7)

References

External links

1987 births
Living people
Swedish male tennis players
Sportspeople from Helsingborg
21st-century Swedish people